Hyperbaena is a genus of plants in family Menispermaceae.

Species

Hyperbaena contains the following species:
Hyperbaena allenii Standl.
Hyperbaena axilliflora
Hyperbaena brevipes 
Hyperbaena columbica
Hyperbaena cubensis
Hyperbaena domingensis
Hyperbaena eladioana
Hyperbaena hassleri 
Hyperbaena ilicifolia
Hyperbaena jalcomulcensis E. Pérez & Cast.-Campos
Hyperbaena laurifolia
Hyperbaena eptobotryosa 
Hyperbaena lindmanii 
Hyperbaena mexicana
Hyperbaena oblongifolia 
Hyperbaena prioriana Miers
Hyperbaena smilacina 
Hyperbaena standleyi 
Hyperbaena tonduzii 
Hyperbaena undulata
Hyperbaena winzerlingii 
Hyperbaena valida Miers

References

Menispermaceae
Menispermaceae genera
Taxonomy articles created by Polbot